Đumezlije is a village in the municipality of Jezero, Bosnia and Herzegovina. Its population was 66 as of the 2013 census, with 32 Bosniaks and 33 Serbs, as well as one Croat. There were 33 women and 33 men as well.

References

Populated places in Jezero, Bosnia and Herzegovina
Villages in Republika Srpska